John Spencer (7 August 1927 – 3 April 1998) was an Australian rules footballer who played with Carlton in the Victorian Football League (VFL).

Notes

External links 

John Spencer's profile at Blueseum

1927 births
Carlton Football Club players
Australian rules footballers from Victoria (Australia)
Brunswick Football Club players
1998 deaths